Roark Gourley is an American painter, sculptor, and mixed media artist in Laguna Beach, California noted for wall sculptures that depict humorous subject matter. In 1992, the Smithsonian's Museum of Natural History commissioned Spaghetti Meets Tomato in the Collision of the Continental Plates, a high relief map of the world with depictions of various foods making up the topography and borders of countries.

Career
Roark was born in Lynwood, California. He received his art training at Orange Coast College, The Art Institute of Southern California Laguna Beach and the University of Colorado where he studied electronic optics, physics, holography, and photography.

Roark specializes in 2.5 dimensional wall sculptures made from wood, resin, and acrylic, often depicting humorous scenarios: pets that match sofas, an out of control executive with 4 arms, chefs cooking up a storm and other whimsical subject matter including, hearts, martinis, shoes, and coffee cups. He ran The Sherwood Gallery in Laguna Beach from 1979 to 1988. In the 1980s Roark created several 2.5 dimensional pieces for Warner Bros. depicting their characters in humorous scenarios, including his Daffy Executive and Golfer Taz.

In addition to light-hearted work, Roark painted portraits of his friends and family . He told Dawn Pettit of Orange Coast Magazine that his most favorite pieces are the two portraits of his wife that are displayed in his Laguna Beach home.

In 2007 he debuted his B-Side, a more serious body of abstract contemporary work featuring light paintings, underwater photography, and 3D Abstract sculpture printed on both traditional and nontraditional materials (plexi-glass and metal).

Projects

The Liquescent Project 

Liquescent is becoming liquid. We come from, are made of, and consume liquid. Water is an integral part of who we are. With breakthrough footage Roark is exploring and rediscovering this underwater world. Liquescent takes you on a journey back to our essence and the aesthetic beauty within.

Liquescent is a short film/documentary that showcase underwater footage of the human form in a liquid environment. By exploring the beautiful local water around Southern California, this pilot film is a treatment to promote a larger Liquescent film. It brings awareness of site specific local water’s beauty and need to preserve. The film is used to further funding for Liquescent II. The pilot film has been shown in local galleries, museums, hotels, art/film festivals, on the internet, and on local television to a broad audience. Liquescent captures the link between our world’s water and humanity, ultimately transcending them as one.

With the use of modern media techniques, Roark has developed his own proprietary lighting style known as Liquescent. While this style appears at times to be out of focus Roark coins it as out of time. “Typically photography is a snapshot of reality, a split second of time. Instead what I am capturing is a window of time-continuous movement from point A to B, in a world of no gravity.”

Liquescent allows you to see what the naked eye can not- movement that is fluid, flowing, unrestricted and graceful. As the beauty unfolds the human form transcends, becoming liquid. The film will reveal this ground breaking technology as well.

Liquescent Project on FaceBook

Roark Studio on FaceBook

Smithsonian Seeds of Change Exhibition

In 1992 Roark Gourley was invited to create a work of art by the heads of The Smithsonian's Natural History Museum, Herman J. Viola, and Carolyn Margolis for the upcoming "Seeds of Change" exhibit. The exhibit was to commemorate the 5th centennial of Columbus discovering the Americas. The exhibit was an attempt to interpret the true meaning of Columbus' voyage and both the negative and positive consequences that followed. The exhibit is named for five "seeds": corn, potatoes, sugar, diseases and horses that through their roles in initiating changes 500 years ago shaped the course of human history in the Americas and altered the lives of people around the world.

Spaghetti Meets Tomato was commissioned by the Smithsonian Institution  to capture the biological and cultural impacts of the encounter between Old and New Worlds. Roark's piece was to tell the story of how the spaghetti met the tomato in a humorous way.

The Foark Tour
In 1999 Roark launched his infamous guerrilla art project, "Forks by Roark". He gathered a team of art students and planted several over-sized brightly colored forks into off-limits Laguna Beach City soil across the street from the annual Festival of the Arts. The purpose of the project he claimed was to amuse people with "giant, unauthorized floating untensils"  Not only did the project amuse, it also poked fun at the absurdities of the system.

After several unauthorized "Foarking" stints in the Laguna Canyon, "Team Foark" was officially invited by several cities around the country to get "Foarked". The first stop was Portland, Oregon where Roark's Foarks graced the elegant grounds of the historic Pittock Mansion. A reception was hosted for the "Foark Team" at the First Avenue Gallery.  Other locations included the Rhode Island School of Design.

Edinburg Children's Hospital Installation
In February 2006, Roark Gourley worked with The Edinburg Children's Hospital to create a light-hearted environment for children suffering from terminal illnesses. He worked with the hospital to create a jungle themed environment that would feel more like a play room than a hospital.

References

Further reading
Pettit, Dawn "The Artists; Creative Expression is a Way of Life for these Nine Locals" Orange Coast Magazine, Sept. 2006 p. 83
Andrews, Jennifer "Take a Walk for Art's Sake" 944 Magazine, Oct. 2007 p. 35
Rodriguez, Charlene "Artist Gives Kids Joy" The Edinburg Review" May 26–28, 2006
Stauffer, Barbara "Seeds of Change" The New World Spring/Summer 1991 No.2 pp. 6–7
Saar, Mayray "Rebel Artist Takes to the Hills in Laguna" The Orange County Register, Wednesday, June 9, 1999
Hunsberger, Brent "Forks in the Road"The Oregonian, August 18, 2000
Goldner, Liz "Roark Gourley: Artist with a Mission" OC Metro, 2003

1949 births
Living people
Sculptors from California